Manikuyil is a 1993 Indian Tamil language romantic drama film directed by Rajavarman. The film stars Murali and Saradha Preetha, with Goundamani, Senthil, Vijayakumar, Charan Raj, Shanmugasundaram, Kokila, A. K. Veerasamy and C. R. Saraswathi playing supporting roles. It was released on 26 February 1993.

Plot 
Muthuvelu lives with his mother Deivanai and grandfather in a mountainous area. Despite being an educated man, he makes his living harvesting honey using traditional methods. The wicked forest officer Sundaram often gets into fights with Muthuvelu. One day, the city girl Kaveri spots Muthuvelu singing a song. She records it with her video camera and then sends the video to a TV channel. Muthuvelu's song is telecasted by the TV channel, and he becomes popular in no time; thus, he becomes a singer. Once again, Muthuvelu and Sundaram get into a fight. This time, Sundaram is suspended from his job by his superiors.

Thereafter, Muthuvelu and Kaveri fall in love with each other. At first, Kaveri's father Ramasamy accepts for their marriage. Sundaram enters their home pretending to be Muthuvelu's father. Deivanai claims that he is not her husband when Ramasamy asks about her husband's identity and she refuses to tell. Ramasamy puts his foot down when she refuses to reveal any pieces of information about Muthuvelu's father. Ramasamy is now grateful to Sundaram and appoints him to work in his factory.

Later that night, Deivanai reveals to Muthuvelu that she was an orphan and lived alone in the past. She had a secret affair with the wealthy man Ratnasabapathy, who promised to marry her. Thereafter, Deivanai received death threats from Ratnasabapathy's relatives and had no other choice but to leave the village. A kindhearted person, now Muthuvelu's grandfather, helped Deivanai and took care of her like his own daughter.

Muthuvelu goes in search of his father Ratnasabapathy and finds that he is now married and has three sons. What transpires later forms the crux of the story.

Cast 

Murali as Muthuvelu
Saradha Preetha as Kaveri
Goundamani
Senthil as Chinna Gounder
Vijayakumar as Ratnasabapathy
Charan Raj as Sundaram
Shanmugasundaram as Ramasamy
Kokila as Deivanai
A. K. Veerasamy as Muthuvelu's grandfather
C. R. Saraswathi as Ratnasabapathy's wife
Sharmili
Idichapuli Selvaraj
Mottai Seetharaman
Thayir Vadai Desikan
Chokkalinga Bhagavathar
Kullamani
Kulla Appu
Kulla Murugan
Gundu Ganesan
Bonda Mani
R. K.

Soundtrack 
The music was composed by Ilaiyaraaja, with lyrics written by Vaali and Ponnadiyan.

Release and reception 
Manikuyil was released on 26 February 1993. Malini Mannath of The Indian Express gave the film a negative review stating : "the story lacks freshness, the screenplay is insipid and direction lack-lustre". R. P. R. of Kalki praised the cinematography as plus point but sarcastically concluded that since the story was too old, if it was considered wine, then the price would go up.

References

External links 
 

1990s Tamil-language films
1993 films
1993 romantic drama films
Films scored by Ilaiyaraaja
Indian romantic drama films